Damacio James Page (born September 30, 1982) is an American professional mixed martial artist currently competing for Legacy Fighting Championship in the Bantamweight division. A professional competitor since 2005, Page has also formerly competed for the WEC, the UFC, Pancrase, King of the Cage, and also fought at K-1 Premium Dynamite 2006!!.

Background
Page was born and raised in the West Side of Albuquerque, New Mexico. Page's parents divorced when he was five years old and he began kickboxing and karate at the age of nine. Page often caused trouble in school, getting into fights and being placed in special education classes for his behavior-disorder. In his sophomore year at West Mesa High School, Page began wrestling and would go on to be a state champion before earning a scholarship to compete for Fresno State University. However, one night three months into his first semester at Fresno State, Page was attacked by eight gang members who left him severely hurt and barely conscious. Because of the incident and transgressions in the past, Page was kicked off of the wrestling team and subsequently lost his scholarship. After the incident, Page found Jackson's Submission Fighting and also continued collegiate wrestling for Cerritos College in Norwalk, California. At Cerritos, Page was a junior college All-American, finishing third in the state during his freshman year and became a state champion in his sophomore year.

Mixed martial arts career

Early career
Page made his professional mixed martial arts debut on February 5, 2005 for the King of the Cage organization. He disposed of his opponent, Will Tolliver, in the first round of their bout with strikes.

After claiming victory in his next two bouts, Page fought and defeated Scott Johnson for the WEF Super Lightweight Championship.

An impressive victory over Stephane Vigneault followed, before Page suffered his first professional defeat. The loss came in his Pancrase debut where he was handled by Japanese fighter, Miki Shida.

Page closed out 2006 with four more fights, winning the first two by TKO but losing the final two by submission to Danny Batten in September and then UFC veteran and Japanese superstar, Genki Sudo on New Year's Eve in K-1.

Fighting just the once in 2007, Page knocked out Rod Montoya at an Extreme Challenge event to improve his record to 6-3.

World Extreme Cagefighting
In 2008, Page signed on to fight for the WEC. He made his debut in a Bantamweight bout against Scott Jorgensen at WEC 32. Page slugged out a unanimous decision victory after three rounds.

Six months later, Page faced the undefeated Brian Bowles and was submitted in short order with a guillotine choke. Page later bounced back from his defeat by defeating #5 ranked Bantamweight fighter at the time, Marcos Galvao at WEC 39 via KO 18 seconds into the first round. He was scheduled to fight Akitoshi Tamura on October 10, 2009 at WEC 43, but Tamura was forced to pull out due to an injury while training.  Tamura was replaced by WEC newcomer Will Campuzano. Page defeated Campuzano via first round submission.

Page was expected to face Takeya Mizugaki on December 19, 2009 at WEC 45, but was forced to withdraw from the card due to injury.

Page was scheduled to face Antonio Banuelos on April 24, 2010 at WEC 48, but Page was forced off the card with another injury.  Banuelos will now face Scott Jorgensen in a rematch of their bout from WEC 41 which Banuelos won via split decision.

Page was expected to face Eddie Wineland on November 11, 2010 at WEC 52.  However, Wineland was forced out of the bout with a shoulder injury and replaced by Demetrious Johnson.  After largely controlling the first round against Johnson, Page seemed to visibly tire toward the end of the second and was defeated via third round submission. Page acknowledged that the long layoff may have contributed to his performance, but refused to blame his conditioning and gave credit to his opponent finishing him.

Ultimate Fighting Championship
On October 28, 2010, World Extreme Cagefighting merged with the Ultimate Fighting Championship. As part of the merger, all WEC fighters were transferred to the UFC.

Page faced former opponent Brian Bowles on March 3, 2011 at UFC Live: Sanchez vs. Kampmann, losing via first round guillotine choke for the second time against Bowles at exactly the same time as their first fight.

Page was expected to face Norifumi Yamamoto on September 24, 2011 at UFC 135.  However, the bout was scrapped on September 1 after both fighters sustained injuries while training for the bout.

Page next faced Brad Pickett on April 14, 2012 at UFC on Fuel TV: Gustafsson vs. Silva.  He lost the fight via submission in the second round.

Page then faced Alex Caceres on July 11, 2012 at UFC on Fuel TV: Munoz vs. Weidman. He lost the fight via submission in the second round.

Page was subsequently released from the UFC following his loss to Caceres.

Post UFC
Page faced previously undefeated Patrick Ybarra at Legacy Fighting Championship 20 on May 31, 2013.  He won the bout via first round knockout. Page faced Matthew Lozano at Legacy Fighting Championship 28 on February 18, 2014. He won the fight via TKO (punches) in the second round.

The Ultimate Fighter
In July 2016, it was revealed that Page was a participant on The Ultimate Fighter: Tournament of Champions. Page was selected as a member of Team Cejudo. He faced Adam Antolin in the opening stage and lost the fight via TKO in the second round.

Personal life
Damacio's body is decorated with multiple tattoos that all represent deep meaning in his life. Page is a religious man and claims the tattoos are a mosaic of his life. The flames on his feet represent his willingness to walk through hell in order to succeed in life. He is starting his own MMA promotion, Southwest Cage Fighting.

Championships and accomplishments
Ultimate Fighting Championship
Fight of the Night (One time) vs. Brad Pickett 
World Extreme Cagefighting
Knockout of the Night (One time) vs. Marcos Galvão 
Legacy Fighting Championships
LFC Flyweight champion (one time, current)
MMAJunkie.com
2014 October Knockout of the Month vs. Brian Hall

Mixed martial arts record

|-
| Loss
| align=center| 19–10
| Alexandre Pantoja
| Technical Submission (triangle choke)
| Legacy FC vs. RFA Superfight Card
| 
| align=center| 2
| align=center| 5:00
| Robinsonville, Mississippi, United States
|  
|-
| Win
| align=center| 19–9
| Brian Hall
| KO (punch)
| Legacy FC 36
| 
| align=center| 1
| align=center| 1:48
| Albuquerque, New Mexico, United States
| 
|-
| Win
| align=center| 18–9
| Elias Garcia
| Submission (arm-triangle choke)
| Legacy FC 31
| 
| align=center| 3
| align=center| 2:47 
| Houston, Texas, United States
| 
|-
| Win
| align=center| 17–9
| Matt Lozano
| TKO (punches)
| Legacy FC 28
| 
| align=center| 2
| align=center| 3:31
| Arlington, Texas, United States
| 
|-
| Loss
| align=center| 16–9
| Marcelo Costa
| Decision (split)
| Strength & Honor Championship 8
| 
| align=center| 3
| align=center| 5:00
| Geneva, Switzerland
| 
|-
| Win
| align=center| 16–8
| Patrick Ybarra
| KO (punch)
| Legacy FC 20
| 
| align=center| 1
| align=center| 1:57
| Corpus Christi, Texas, United States
| 
|-
| Loss
| align=center| 15–8 
| Alex Caceres
| Submission (triangle choke)
| UFC on Fuel TV: Munoz vs. Weidman
| 
| align=center| 2
| align=center| 1:27
| San Jose, California, United States
| 
|-
| Loss
| align=center| 15–7
| Brad Pickett
| Submission (rear-naked choke)
| UFC on Fuel TV: Gustafsson vs. Silva
| 
| align=center| 2
| align=center| 4:05
| Stockholm, Sweden
| 
|-
| Loss
| align=center| 15–6
| Brian Bowles
| Technical Submission (guillotine choke)
| UFC Live: Sanchez vs. Kampmann
| 
| align=center| 1
| align=center| 3:30
| Louisville, Kentucky, United States
| 
|-
| Loss
| align=center| 15–5
| Demetrious Johnson
| Submission (guillotine choke)
| WEC 52
| 
| align=center| 3
| align=center| 2:27
| Las Vegas, Nevada, United States
| 
|-
| Win
| align=center| 15–4
| Will Campuzano
| Submission (rear-naked choke)
| WEC 43
| 
| align=center| 1
| align=center| 1:02
| San Antonio, Texas, United States
| 
|-
| Win
| align=center| 14–4
| Marcos Galvão
| KO (punches)
| WEC 39
| 
| align=center| 1
| align=center| 0:18
| Corpus Christi, Texas, United States
| 
|-
| Loss
| align=center| 13–4
| Brian Bowles
| Submission (guillotine choke)
| WEC 35: Condit vs. Miura
| 
| align=center| 1
| align=center| 3:30
| Las Vegas, Nevada, United States
| 
|-
| Win
| align=center| 13–3
| Scott Jorgensen
| Decision (unanimous)
| WEC 32: Condit vs. Prater
| 
| align=center| 3
| align=center| 5:00
| Rio Rancho, New Mexico, United States
| 
|-
| Win
| align=center| 12–3
| Travis Sherman
| Submission (rear-naked choke)
| SCA: Duke City Final Fury
| 
| align=center| 1
| align=center| 0:12
| Albuquerque, New Mexico, United States
| 
|-
| Win
| align=center| 11–3
| Richard Montano
| TKO (punches)
| SCA: Duke City Bike and Brawl
| 
| align=center| 3
| align=center| 3:33
| Albuquerque, New Mexico, United States
| 
|-
| Win
| align=center| 10–3
| Anthony Jensen
| TKO (punches)
| SCA: Duke City Brawl
| 
| align=center| 1
| align=center| 1:37
| Albuquerque, New Mexico, United States
| 
|-
| Win 
| align=center| 9–3
| Rod Montoya
| KO (elbows)
| Extreme Challenge 74
| 
| align=center| 1
| align=center| 2:32
| Iowa City, Iowa, United States
| 
|-
| Loss
| align=center| 8–3
| Genki Sudo
| Submission (triangle choke)
| K-1 Premium 2006 Dynamite!!
| 
| align=center| 1
| align=center| 3:05
| Osaka, Japan
| 
|-
| Loss
| align=center| 8–2
| Danny Batten
| Submission (armbar)
| World Pro Fighting Championships
| 
| align=center| 1
| align=center| 0:37
| Las Vegas, Nevada, United States
| 
|-
| Win
| align=center| 8–1
| Mark Haire
| KO (punch)
| Fightworld 10
| 
| align=center| 1
| align=center| 0:06
| Albuquerque, New Mexico, United States
| 
|-
| Win
| align=center| 7–1
| Thierry Quenneville
| KO (slam)
| TKO 25: Confrontation
| 
| align=center| 1
| align=center| 1:02
| Montreal, Quebec, Canada
| 
|-
| Loss
| align=center| 6–1
| Miki Shida
| Decision (unanimous)
| Pancrase: Blow 3
| 
| align=center| 3
| align=center| 5:00
| Tokyo, Japan
| 
|-
| Win
| align=center| 6–0
| Zack Schroeder
| Submission (armbar)
| PNRF: Mayhem in Vegas
| 
| align=center| 1
| align=center| N/A
| Las Vegas, Nevada, United States
| 
|-
| Win
| align=center| 5–0
| Stephane Vigneault
| KO (punch)
| TKO 24: Eruption
| 
| align=center| 1
| align=center| 1:20
| Laval, Quebec, Canada
| 
|-
| Win
| align=center| 4–0
| Scott Johnson
| Submission (armbar)
| World Extreme Fighting 16
| 
| align=center| 1
| align=center| 0:30
| Enid, Oklahoma, United States
| 
|-
| Win
| align=center| 3–0
| Hyatto Kawabato
| Submission (rear-naked choke)
| PNRF: Demolition
| 
| align=center| 2
| align=center| 1:46
| Albuquerque, New Mexico, United States
| 
|-
| Win
| align=center| 2–0
| Jeremy Floyd
| Submission (rear-naked choke)
| KOTC 50: First Blood
| 
| align=center| 1
| align=center| 1:33
| Socorro, New Mexico, United States
| 
|-
| Win
| align=center| 1–0
| Will Tolliver
| TKO (punches)
| KOTC 47: Uprising
| 
| align=center| 1
| align=center| N/A
| Albuquerque, New Mexico, United States
|

Mixed martial arts exhibition record

|-
|Loss
|align=center|0–1
| Adam Antolin
| TKO (body kick and punches)
| The Ultimate Fighter: Tournament of Champions
|
|align=center|2
|align=center|0:32
|Las Vegas, Nevada, United States
|

References

External links
Official UFC Profile

Damacio Page's WEC profile

American male mixed martial artists
Mixed martial artists from New Mexico
American mixed martial artists of Mexican descent
Mixed martial artists utilizing karate
Mixed martial artists utilizing collegiate wrestling
Mixed martial artists utilizing freestyle wrestling
American male kickboxers
American male karateka
1982 births
Living people
Sportspeople from Albuquerque, New Mexico
Ultimate Fighting Championship male fighters